Alex de Oliveira Nascimento (born 10 May 1999), simply known as Alex, is a Brazilian footballer who plays as a central defender for Santos.

Club career

Fluminense
Born in Ribeirão Preto, São Paulo, Alex joined Fluminense's youth setup in June 2016, from São Paulo. On 17 January 2018, he appeared as an unused substitute in a 3–1 Campeonato Carioca away loss against Boavista.

Alex made his first team – and Série A – on 27 October 2018, replacing injured Frazan in a 3–0 loss at Santos.

Santos
Alex joined Santos on 7 May 2019, initially assigned to the under-20 squad. Fluminense also retained 30% of the player's federative rights. On 30 July, after nearly three months at the club, he renewed his contract until December 2023.

On 22 January 2020, as both first team regulars Lucas Veríssimo and Felipe Aguilar were injured, Alex was included in Jesualdo Ferreira's 28-man squad for the 2020 Campeonato Paulista. On 1 July, he further extended his contract until 2024, and made his debut for the club on 16 August, replacing injured Veríssimo in a 3–1 home win against Athletico Paranaense.

Alex made his Copa Libertadores debut on 24 September 2020, again replacing Veríssimo in a 2–1 away defeat of Delfín SC. On 10 November, it was announced that he and a further six first team players tested positive for COVID-19.

Loan to Famalicão
On 17 August 2021, Alex moved abroad and joined Portuguese Primeira Liga side Famalicão on a one-year loan deal. He made his debut for the club on 28 August, replacing Pêpê late into a 1–1 home draw against Sporting CP.

2022 season
Alex returned to Santos in July 2022, as Famalicão did not activate his buyout clause. An immediate backup to starters Maicon and Eduardo Bauermann, he scored his first goal for the club on 25 October, but in a 3–2 away loss against Flamengo.

Career statistics

References

External links

Santos FC profile 
International Sports profile 

1999 births
Living people
Brazilian footballers
Association football defenders
Campeonato Brasileiro Série A players
Fluminense FC players
Santos FC players
Primeira Liga players
F.C. Famalicão players
Brazilian expatriate footballers
Brazilian expatriate sportspeople in Portugal
Expatriate footballers in Portugal
People from Ribeirão Preto
Footballers from São Paulo (state)